Nitrianske Rudno is a village and municipality in Prievidza District in the Trenčín Region of western Slovakia.

History
In historical records the village was first mentioned in 1275.

Geography
The municipality lies at an altitude of 318 metres and covers an area of 14.501 km2. It has a population of about 1960 people.

External links
 
 
http://www.statistics.sk/mosmis/eng/run.html

Villages and municipalities in Prievidza District